The Mob was a one-off project (or supergroup) consisting of Doug Pinnick, Reb Beach, Kip Winger, Kelly Keagy, and Timothy Drury. The band released one self-titled album in 2005 on Frontiers Records.

Track listing
All tracks written by Reb Beach, Kip Winger, and Doug Pinnick except as indicated.
 "One Track Mind" – 4:20
 "Wait" – 4:38
 "The Magic" – 4:31
 "I Will Follow" – 4:34
 "Guitar Solo" (Beach) – 1:21
 "Never Get Enough" – 4:51
 "Love Will Carry On" – 4:23
 "Turn To Stone" – 3:54
 "No Reasons Why" – 3:23
 "Spaghetti Western" (Beach) – 3:20
 "I Want To Live Forever" – 3:37

Personnel

 Reb Beach – guitars, backing vocals
 Doug Pinnick – lead vocals
 Kip Winger – bass guitar, backing vocals
 Kelly Keagy – drums, backing vocals and lead vocals on "The Magic"
 Timothy Drury – keyboards, backing vocals

Album credits
 Produced by Kip Winger
 Engineered by Joseph Rusineck and Kip Winger
 Logo design by Carl-Andrè Beckston
 Artwork by Giulio Cataldo

References 

American supergroups
American rock music groups
Frontiers Records artists